Jacques l'Hermite (c. 1582 – June 2, 1624), sometimes also known as Jacques le Clerq , was a Dutch merchant, explorer, and admiral known for his journey around the globe with the Nassau Fleet (1623–1626) and for his blockade and raid on Callao in 1624 during that same voyage in which he also died. He served the Dutch East India Company as chief merchant in Bantam and Ambon Island in the Dutch East Indies. The Chilean Hermite Islands near Cape Horn which his fleet charted in February 1624 are named after him.

Personal life
L'Hermite was born in Antwerp, Dutch Republic (present-day Belgium) around the year 1582. After the fall of Antwerp in 1585 in a battle with the Spanish Empire, the family moved north to Amsterdam and later settled in Rotterdam. He left the Republic in 1606 and spent the next six years working in the Dutch East Indies.

Professional life
In 1606, l'Hermite set sail to the Dutch East Indies as a secretary on the fleet commanded by Admiral Cornelis Matelief Jr. where in 1607 he was appointed chief merchant on the Black Lion. From 1607 to 1611 l'Hermite was chief merchant for the Dutch East India Company in Bantam, Dutch East Indies. After six years working abroad he returned to Amsterdam in the Dutch Republic. There he married Theodora van Wely in March 1613.

In April 1623, l'Hermite was commissioned by Prince Maurice of Nassau and the Dutch State General to lead a fleet of eleven ships known as the Nassau Fleet with its flagship Amsterdam. The fleet set sail on a circumnavigational voyage westwards from Amsterdam to the western coast of South America with the objective to hunt down Spanish silver ships leaving Peru and to establish a Dutch colony in either Peru or Chile, at that time known as the Viceroyalty of Peru.

Although commanded by Admiral l'Hermite, the fleet was de facto led by his Vice-Admiral Gheen Huygen Schapenham and Rear-Admiral Julius Wilhelm Van Verschoor after l'Hermite like most of its crew suffered from dysentery during the journey. In early 1624, the fleet passed Cape Horn through Lemaire Channel and explored and charted the Hermite Islands. In May 1624, the fleet blocked the port of Callao and raided the cities of Pisco and Guayaquil, but they were unsuccessful in establishing a colony and the fleet was forced to continue its voyage westwards towards the Dutch East Indies.

Death
L'Hermite died on June 2, 1624, during the blockade of Callao after suffering from dysentery and scurvy for months. He was buried on San Lorenzo Island off the coast of Callao, Peru.

See also
 Pirates in Callao

References

Bibliography
 
 
  
  

1580s births
1624 deaths
Businesspeople from Antwerp
17th-century Dutch East Indies people
Admirals of the navy of the Dutch Republic
Dutch merchants
17th-century merchants
17th-century Dutch explorers
Circumnavigators of the globe
Explorers of South America
Deaths from scurvy
17th-century Dutch businesspeople
Dutch East India Company people